Poman Lo (Chinese: 羅寶文) is founder and faculty advisor of the Institute of Sustainability and Technology, a Hong Kong non-profit organization that is supported by Century City Group and in partnership with the Hong Kong University of Science and Technology (where she was appointed in 2022 as Adjunct Professor of Management), with a mission to train the next generation of ESG talent via educational programs, interdisciplinary research, and thought leadership initiatives.  Poman is also founder and managing partner of AlphaTrio Capital, an Asian sustainable technology fund that empowers solutions for environmental and social challenges by investing in early-stage startups in green tech, agrifood tech, and financial tech for financial inclusion. In the area of Web3, she has been a pioneer by founding MetaGreen, the world's first green metropolis in the metaverse, which is a collaborative ecosystem of likeminded partners co-creating a progressive green movement to inspire decarbonisation and behavioural changes in the consumer and business communities.

Poman serves as the vice chairman and managing director of Century City International Holdings Limited and Regal Hotels International Holdings Limited.

Poman also founded Bodhi Love Foundation, a Hong Kong registered charity dedicated to nurturing the next generation of global citizens and leaders. As of 2022, the charity's flagship SEED (Social, Emotional, Ethical Development) pilot program has trained over 100 Hong Kong kindergarten teachers in mindfulness, with a view to fostering the critical skills for the development of self-awareness, empathy, and interconnectedness in young children. Bodhi Love Foundation has also recently announced the establishment of MetaGreen Academy, the first metaverse-based secondary school green curriculum, developed in partnership with HKUST.

To inspire positive values and character development among children, Poman launched Bodhi and Friends, an edutainment venture based on her pet dog that had become China's first global cartoon brand by 2016, as the first and only one to be licensed by industry leaders such as Mattel, Scholastic, and Minecraft for global toys, games, and children books.  She also partnered with KFC and distributed over 3 million Bodhi and Friends bilingual books among 4,000 KFC outlets in China.

She is a frequently sought-after public speaker and thought leader in the areas of sustainability, green finance, and management, including having accepted invitations to speak by the Milken Institute, UN Global Compact Leaders Summit, Financial Times, South China Morning Post, and more.

Poman holds the distinction of being the only person in Hong Kong to have received the “Hong Kong Outstanding Students Award,” the “Outstanding Young Person Award of Hong Kong” and “Outstanding Young Person of the World Award.” 
In 2015, she became the first female Asian recipient of the Oslo Business for Peace Award by the Business for Peace Foundation in Norway, which recognizes business leaders who strive to improve society by creating value for all stakeholders in an ethical and responsible way.

Early life 
Poman is the granddaughter of Hong Kong property tycoon Lo Ying-shek, who co-founded Great Eagle Holdings and was known locally as the "tycoon of Hong Kong hotels."

At 14, Poman became the youngest person to have won the “Hong Kong Outstanding Students Award”, which is an annual student contest which since 1985 has selected the region’s most promising students based on the following criteria: outstanding academic performance, extracurricular achievement, community service track record, commitment to society, leadership potential and morality. She later became the only awardee to also be subsequently selected for the Outstanding Young Person of the World Award.  A child prodigy, Poman was awarded the Angier B. Duke Scholarship at 15 and graduated summa cum laude with a BA in Psychology from Duke University at 19. In 2005, she co-authored a chapter in the book, Asian Culture and Psychotherapy, with Professor Fanny M. Cheung and Professor Yiqun Gan which examined the influence of sociocultural context on individuals’ manifestations of abnormal behavior that affect treatment outcomes of psychotherapy amongst Chinese patients.

Bodhi Love Foundation 
In 2013, Poman founded Bodhi Love Foundation (BLF) in Hong Kong with a view to investing in children’s holistic development, as a prerequisite for both personal well-being and social success.  In 2015, the organization attained Section 88 tax exempt charity status from the Inland Revenue Department.  The charity has organized several charitable events and student competitions, in addition to donating towards various causes such as the Bodhi Love Foundation Entrance Scholarship for Bachelor of Veterinary Medicine at the City University of Hong Kong.  From 2020-2021, the best-selling author of “Emotional Intelligence”, Dr. Daniel Goleman, served as an advisor to the charity.  As of 2021, the Foundation has focused on providing social and emotional education for local children in underprivileged schools through its SEED (Social, Emotional and Ethical Development) program. As of 2022, it has implemented SEED in 11 pilot kindergartens where instructors have trained over 100 teachers in mindfulness and equipped them with skills needed to deliver a locally adapted evidence-based kindness curriculum for children.

ESG Commitment 
Since joining the family business in 2000, Poman has led Regal Hotels International’s emergence as a sustainability leader in Hong Kong’s hospitality industry.  In 2010, the Regal iclub Hotel in Wan Chai was established and became the first in Hong Kong to be granted carbon neutral status. The hotel group’s commitment to the environment has continued to grow. All five Regal hotels in Hong Kong have since achieved both EarthCheck Gold Certification and the Class of Excellence Wastewi$e Label of the Hong Kong Awards for Environmental Excellence.  Four iclub hotels were also recognized with EarthCheck Silver Certification. 

The hotel group was awarded the “20 Years Plus Caring Company” recognition by The Hong Kong Council of Social Service to recognize the organization’s longstanding efforts in corporate social responsibility by caring for the community, employees and the environment. Led by Poman’s investment strategy, the hotel group has also backed numerous startups operating around the world, including investments in the fields of agritech, healthtech, education tech and more. 

In 2022, at the height of the COVID-19 pandemic in Hong Kong, Poman Lo led Regal Hotels Group in cooperating with various government departments and charitable organizations to provide support among the elderly, including the donation of food and health supplies to those in need. She also established “Bodhi Online”, a free hotline to provide counseling support for the elderly to relieve emotional stress and foster holistic well-being.

Bodhi and Friends 
Children’s Books

In 2006, Poman decided to resume contributing to children’s healthy psychological development.  A dog lover, she turned her poodle into a cartoon character named Bodhi.  Working with students from a local vocational institute in Hong Kong, Poman launched a comic series that was published daily in Metro Daily and weekly in East Week and Whiz Kids Express, reaching a total of 1.5 million potential readers every week. In 2007, she published a Chinese children’s book entitled Bodhi Happy Family – Moral and Civic Education, which is a collection of comic stories intended to inspire moral development in youngsters.  In 2010, she published 5 Quotients to Success, a creative compilation of pictures and original comic artwork paired with inspirational quotes to foster holistic development.  Poman donated the author’s royalties received for both books entirely to support Po Leung Kuk’s Language Training Program for orphans. 

Animated Series

In 2012, Poman founded Century Innovative Technology to build Bodhi and Friends as a leading household brand in China, utilizing edutainment to achieve its mission to inspire positive values and character development among children.  In 2014, the first season of her 3D animated television series, Bodhi and Friends, made its CCTV Children Channel debut during the winter holiday at 6 p.m. prime time, accumulating more than 100 million views across online video platforms and winning awards such as the 2014 Macau International Film Festival’s Gold Lotus Award for Best TV Animation and the 2014 Shenzhen Animation Festival’s Gold Award.   The Bodhi and Friends series was later aired on more than 100 regional channels, attracting over 350 million views and gaining the number one spot on both CCTV Children Channel and Hunan Television, the two most popular children’s TV channels in China.  By 2016, Bodhi and Friends had become China's first global cartoon brand, as it is the first and only to be licensed by industry leaders such as Mattel, Scholastic, and Minecraft for global toys and children books.  This was the first time that Mattel had licensed a Chinese animation in its seventy plus years of history.  Riding on the growing popularity of Bodhi and Friends, Century Innovative Technology partnered with KFC in 2017 and 2018 and distributed over 3 million Bodhi and Friends bilingual books among 4,000 KFC outlets in China.

Philanthropy
As an active figure in the community, Poman presently serves as Member of the HKSAR Election Committee (Hotel Subsector), Central Advisory Board Member of the Hong Kong Police Force Animal Watchers Programme, and Steering Committee Member of the HKSAR Government Scholarship Fund. She also currently sits on the Board of the Yale Emotional Intelligence China Center.

Poman was elected Chairperson of The Outstanding Young Persons’ Association for the 2014-2015 term and Chairman of the Tomorrow’s Leaders Summit.  She was also previously appointed and served on the board of various other organizations such as the City University of Hong Kong (where she was also Trustee), Quality Education Fund, Hong Kong Tourism Board, Country and Marine Parks Board, Lord Wilson Heritage Trust, Duke Kunshan University Foundation and Teach for Hong Kong.  In addition, Poman is a former committee member of UNICEF Hong Kong, Centum Charitas Foundation and Admission of Quality Migrants and Professionals. Her other previous volunteer engagements include serving as an Ambassador of Oxfam HK, Doctor Pet and Hong Kong Guide Dog Association.

Personal life
Poman is a devout Buddhist and is currently completing a part-time Master’s degree in Buddhist Studies.  She has been a vegetarian since 2007. She has also penned the lyrics for three hit songs. One was “Love Paradise”, a popular English Cantopop song performed by Kelly Chen and written as part of the award-winning marketing campaign for Regalia Bay, a large modern townhouse development in Stanley which was completed in 2004. Another song Poman wrote the lyrics for was “Love and Shine”, the Mandarin theme song of Bodhi and Friends. The third song she wrote was the Mandopop song “Dream of Bliss 《幸福夢》”, performed by Zhang Bichen.

References

Angier B. Duke Scholars
Living people
Hong Kong businesspeople
Year of birth missing (living people)